The Medal of Military Valor (Italian language: Medaglia al valor militare) is an Italian medal, originally established as a Sardinian award. It is awarded to military personnel, units above the level of company, and civilians for exceptional valor in the face of the enemy.

The medal has three levels:

 The Gold Medal of Military Valor, established on 21 May 1793 by King Victor Amadeus III of Sardinia.
 The Silver Medal of Military Valor, established in 1833 by King Charles Albert of Sardinia.
 The Bronze Medal of Military Valor, established in 1887 by King Umberto I of Italy.

Description
All three levels have the same design:
Obverse: Up to 1946, a wreath containing the arms of the House of Savoy surmounted by a Crown, surrounded by the inscription "AL VALORE MILITARE". Awards of the Republic of Italy replace the arms of Savoy with the emblem of Italy. A version was also produced by the Italian Social Republic in 1943 in which the central arms are replaced by a Gladius.
Reverse: A laurel wreath. The name of the recipient is sometimes engraved within the wreath. 
Ribbon: Bright blue moire for all levels.
Each medal can be earned several times by the same recipient, entitling them to wear two or more identical medals,
although from 1915 to 1922 the gold and silver medals could only be awarded three times to any one man, any further act of bravery being rewarded by a promotion.

Award history
Originally an award of the Kingdom of Sardinia, it became an Italian decoration on the creation of the Kingdom of Italy in 1861, being also used by the Italian Social Republic between 1943 and 1945. It is a now awarded by the Republic of Italy.

The award began as the Order of Military Valor established by Victor Amadeus III in 1793. Falling into disuse during the Napoleonic era, it was revived on 1 April 1815 by Victor Emmanuel I. Emmanuel I repealed the institution a few months later, on 4 August 1815, replacing the medals for bravery with the Military Order of Savoy.

In 1833, King Charles Albert acknowledged that the requirements for the grant of the Military Order were too strict, and re-established medals for valor in gold and silver to reward selfless acts in war and in peace by the military.

The medal was awarded for the Crimean War, the reverse inscribed "Spedizione d'Oriente 1854-1856" outside the wreath. Awards of this medal in silver included to 450 officers and men of the allied British Royal Navy and Army.

In 1887 the medal in bronze was authorised by King Umberto I. Soldiers who had received honourable mentions (menzioni onorevoli) for bravery between 1848 and 1887 were granted the bronze medal, and from this date it was awarded to those whose acts of bravery did not justify the higher gold or silver levels.

During the First World War a total of 368 Gold, 38,614 Silver and 60,244 Bronze medals were awarded for individual acts of heroism. In 1916 Tsar Nicholas II of Russia was awarded the Medal of Military Valor in Gold, the only foreign head of state to receive this award.

Royal Decree #1423 of 4 November 1932 defined new rules for granting the Valor medals, as well as the War Cross for Military Valor and the Cross of Merit of War. In the text of the decree, Articles 1 and 3 define the areas of basic and primary application for the grant of these honors. Article 1 states:

While Article 3 provides that:

The full text of Royal Decree was published in the Gazzetta Ufficiale 12 November 1932, #261.

Nominations for the medal, except in exceptional cases provided for in time of war, are scrutinized by a special military commission.

The award is intended for the military (individuals or entire military units, not below Company level), former partisan combatants, municipalities, provinces, and individual citizens.

Types 

Decorations for Valor are divided into the following classes:
 Gold Medal for Military Valor (26 March 1833 – 10 May 1943)
 Gold Medal for Military Valor (10 May 1943 – Present)
 Silver Medal for Valor (26 March 1833 – Present)
 Bronze Medal for Valor (8 December 1887 – 10 May 1943)
 Bronze Medal for Valor (10 May 1943 – Present)
 War Cross for Military Valor (10 May 1943 – Present)

 Gold Medal of Valor in the Army
 Silver Medal of Valor in the Army
 Bronze Medal of Valor in the Army

 Medaglia d'oro al valore di marina
 Medaglia d'argento al valore di marina
 Medaglia di bronzo al valore di marina

 Medaglia d'oro al valore aeronautico
 Medaglia d'argento al valore aeronautico
 Medaglia di bronzo al valore aeronautico

 Medaglia d'oro al valore dei carabinieri
 Medaglia d'argento al valore dei carabinieri
 Medaglia di bronzo al valore dei carabinieri

 Medaglia d'oro al valore della Guardia di Finanza
 Medaglia d'argento al valore della Guardia di Finanza
 Medaglia di bronzo al valore della Guardia di Finanza

Medals of Merit 

 Croce d'oro al merito dell'esercito
 Croce d'argento al merito dell'esercito
 Croce di bronzo al merito dell'esercito

 medaglia d'oro al merito di marina
 Medaglia d'argento al merito di marina
 Medaglia di bronzo al merito di marina

 Croce d'oro al merito dell'aeronautica
 Croce d'argento al merito dell'aeronautica
 Croce di bronzo al merito dell'aeronautica

 Croce d'oro al merito dei carabinieri
 Croce d'argento al merito dei carabinieri
 Croce di bronzo al merito dei carabinieri

 Croce d'oro al merito della Guardia di Finanza
 Croce d'argento al merito della Guardia di Finanza
 Croce di bronzo al merito della Guardia di Finanza

 Croce al merito di guerra, seconda concessione
 Croce al merito di guerra

References

External links
 Regio decreto n. 1423 del 4 novembre 1932 dal sito del Quirinale
 Presidency of the Italian Republic: Honors. Elenco decorati di medaglia d'oro al valor militare

Military awards and decorations of Italy
Awards established in 1793
1793 establishments in Europe